One of the Boys is the second studio album by American singer Katy Perry. It was released on June 17, 2008, by Capitol Records. She collaborated on the album with producers Greg Wells, Dr. Luke, Dave Stewart, Max Martin, and Ted Bruner among others, and wrote most of the songs in collaboration with other producers and writers. However, the title track, "Thinking of You", and "Mannequin" were both written by Perry alone. The EP Ur So Gay, containing the song of the same name, was released in 2007 to generate interest in the singer and the album.

One of the Boys is Perry's first album under the stage name Katy Perry, following her debut Katy Hudson (2001), which was released under her real name on Red Hill Records. It received mixed reception from critics, with some deeming it as being filled with "potential hits" and others criticizing the material they perceived to be weak. Commercially, it debuted at number nine on the US Billboard 200, selling over 47,000 copies in its first week of sales, and also peaked within the top-ten charts in Austria, Canada, Denmark, Germany, Ireland, Mexico, Norway, and Switzerland. One of the Boys earned Perry two Grammy Award nominations, and has sold 7 million copies worldwide, being her third highest-selling album to date. It has been certified triple platinum by the Recording Industry Association of America.

The album's lead single "I Kissed a Girl" became Perry's first Billboard Hot 100 number-one single; the second single "Hot n Cold" reached number three in the United States, while topping the charts in Germany, Canada, the Netherlands, and Austria, among others. The third single "Thinking of You" reached the top-thirty in the US, while the fourth and final single "Waking Up in Vegas" became a top-ten hit and her third top-ten hit overall. To further promote the album, Perry embarked on three concert tours: the 2008 Warped Tour, her first solo world tour, the Hello Katy Tour, and served as an opening act in No Doubt's 2009 Summer Tour.

Background
Perry's change in record label, and adoption of a pseudonymous surname accompanied a shift from the Christian rock of her debut album Katy Hudson. The singer stated that she had been working on the album since she was eighteen years old. During the making of the album, Perry was dropped from two record labels and went through two shelved albums, one meant for an early 2005 release and another meant for a late 2007 release. The planned 2007 release was titled Fingerprints, with songs intended for Fingerprints making it onto One of the Boys. Some of the material on Fingerprints that did not make it on One of the Boys were given to other artists, such as "I Do Not Hook Up" and "Long Shot" to Kelly Clarkson, "Breakout" and "The Driveway" to Miley Cyrus and "Rock God" and "That's More Like It" to Selena Gomez & the Scene.

During this time, Perry had written close to a hundred songs. Perry collaborated with producers Greg Wells, Dr. Luke, Dave Stewart, and Max Martin among others on the album. Perry co-wrote every song on the album as well as writing three of the songs herself.

Once signed to Capitol, label head Jason Flom started work on a new album by convincing Dr. Luke to go back into the studio with Perry, with the two having already worked together on the abandoned Columbia sessions. Together with Max Martin they wrote and cut "I Kissed a Girl" and "Hot n Cold". Perry then collaborated again with Greg Wells, who she had also worked with on the Columbia album, creating the songs "Ur So Gay" and "Mannequin". According to Perry's A&R Chris Anokute they ended up with five new songs and then chose six of the songs from the shelved Columbia album to compile One of the Boys. When talking about the songs on the album Perry said that she released the single "Ur So Gay" as an introduction to the album:

Music and lyrics

Themes and influences
Although Perry's musical style and way of composing ironic and bawdy songs has been heavily compared to the style of singers Avril Lavigne and Lily Allen, the singer was influenced by Queen and Freddie Mercury in particular. All songs on the album were written by Perry, assisted by musicians Greg Wells, Max Martin, Dr. Luke, Cathy Dennis, Desmond Child, Andreas Carlsson, Sam Hollander, Dave Katz, S*A*M and Sluggo, Ted Bruner, Scott Cutler, Anne Preven, Dave Stewart, and Glen Ballard. The album includes several tracks that tell stories — a balance of sad songs and happier tunes. About these opposites, she said, "I think people can appreciate a songwriter who shows different sides..... I've put everything into [this album] and I feel like it's my baby." Its primary sound is a pop rock, soft rock, pop-punk, and power pop one.

Songs

The opening track is the title track "One of the Boys", where Perry express that she does not want to "be one of the boys of her love interest", describing the song, Charles A. Hohman from PopMatters noted that "she used to belch the alphabet and tape down her tits, but one summer, the tomboy lifestyle just didn't hold her interest, so she started 'studying Lolita religiously' and noticing guys noticing her." The second track is the lead single "I Kissed a Girl" generated some controversy, dealing with the subject of lesbianism. The song was inspired by actress Scarlett Johansson. Musically, it is a pop rock track. It contains influences of new wave and runs through a throbbing beat and an organic instrumental thump, according to About.com's Bill Lamb. The track features instrumentation provided by drums, guitars and bass. The song sparked controversy for its homosexual themes. The album's third song is "Waking Up In Vegas". The song deals with trips with friends to Las Vegas. "Thinking of You" is the first ballad of the album. It is a downtempo pop rock song, as the singer reflects on settling for the second best: "You said move on, where do I go?"/"I guess second best, it is all I will know", she sings. Reviewing the song, editor CT from Billboard described it as "a mid-'90s No Doubt pop/rock palette".

The fifth track is  "Mannequin". "Ur So Gay" was composed as a tool of revenge by the singer on her ex-boyfriend, where Perry satirizes his exaggerated emo style and metrosexual attitude. It is a trip hop track with a moderate tempo.  In the seventh track "Hot n Cold", Perry discusses the theme of uncertainty and the ups and downs of relationships. It is a synthpop song which utilizes guitars and synthesizers. "If You Can Afford Me" cops a mixed message about female materialism. Sal Cinquemani from Slant Magazine compared the song with Madonna's song "Material Girl" (1984). "Lost" and "I'm Still Breathing" are both ballads, in the latter, she sings: "I leave the gas on/Walk the alleys in the dark", the verse use a metaphor for a dying relationship.

Release and promotion

The album was first released on June 17, 2008. It was released in separate editions: the standard edition, the Australian Tour edition, which contains the standard CD plus a bonus CD (which was also released as a separate EP on the Australian iTunes Store) containing an acoustic version of "Thinking of You" and remixes, the special edition, which is packaged in a digipak and contains four bonus tracks, and the Japanese re-issue. The European, Japanese, and iTunes editions of the album all contain bonus tracks.

Upon its release, the singer has been heavily criticized for her song, "Ur So Gay", considered by the site The New Gay to be homophobic. The author of the publication added, "It's time to Katy Perry to stop talking nonsense" because "the song trots out a number of tired gay stereotypes to condemn one of Perry's ex-boyfriends and includes a paradoxical chorus". Jane Czyzselska from The Guardian commented that "Perry's song is a rather sweet, refreshing antidote to the avalanche of overtly sexualized boy-grinds-girl songs." She promoted the song in Portugal, and it was not very well received by the public. Her first single, "I Kissed a Girl", became a worldwide controversy. Despite the context, Perry mentioned several times that she does not define herself as heterosexual. She has been strongly criticized by the LGBT community, who believe that the singer used music to make money and not on behalf of homosexuals, and by critics who claimed that music leads the girls to be lesbian. The song was criticized by the local headquarters of the evangelical Havens Corners Church, which has set the following sentence in its garden in September 2008: "I kissed a girl and liked it. So I went to hell." To promote the album Perry embarked on three tours: the Warped Tour 2008, her first solo world tour, the Hello Katy Tour, with 89 shows performed, and No Doubt's Summer Tour 2009 as its opening act.

Singles

The album's lead single, "I Kissed a Girl" was released in late April and subsequently soared up the charts. "I Kissed a Girl" was a commercial success. It topped the Billboard Hot 100 chart, becoming the 1000th chart-topper of the rock era. The song has since become a major worldwide hit, and along with the United States, it has topped the charts in more than twenty countries, including Australia, Canada, Ireland, and the United Kingdom. 

The second single, "Hot n Cold", made it onto the chart after the album came out due to digital downloads. It was released as a single in early September, and peaked at number three on the US charts, making it Perry's second consecutive top five single. On November 14, the song became Perry's first number one on radio airplay. It is officially one of the ten best-selling digitally downloaded songs of all time after its initial run.

"Thinking of You", the penultimate single, was originally planned to be the first single from the album, but was scrapped for "I Kissed a Girl" due to latter song's surge in popularity. "Thinking of You" received a video in late April 2008, but the video was removed from YouTube and replaced by a new video after the single was re-released as the third international single from the album. Perry shot the second video with director Melina Matsoukas in the first week of December 2008. The video for the single was released on December 23, 2008. The track peaked at number twenty-nine on the Billboard Hot 100 on the week of February 12, 2009 where it remained for the next two weeks before declining to number thirty-one in its seventh week on the chart. 

"Waking Up in Vegas" is the fourth and final single from the album. It went for radio adds on April 21, 2009, in the US. It was released to Australian radio on March 23, 2009, where it became the fourth most added song in its release week. Perry performed it on American Idol in May, resulting in a surge of sales for the song. The music video was shot by Joseph Kahn during March 2009 in Las Vegas and officially premiered on the iTunes Store in the US, and Australia on April 28, 2009. It peaked at number nine on the Billboard Hot 100, becoming the third top-ten single from the album.

Critical reception

The album received generally mixed reviews from critics. On Metacritic, which assigns a normalized rating out of 100 to reviews from mainstream critics, the album has received a score of 47, citing "mixed or average reviews". A highly positive review came from Kerri Mason of Billboard, who felt it was "packed with potential hits." Blender argued, "Perry's creative-writing-class punch lines don't always justify her self-congratulatory drag-queen tone. But she hiccups quirkily enough, and myriad big-name producers (from Dr. Luke to Glen Ballard) keep the new-wave synth hooks hopping." Stephen Thomas Erlewine of AllMusic initially gave the album two out of five stars, remarking it "sinks to crass, craven depths that turn One of the Boys into a grotesque emblem of all the wretched excesses of this decade"; however, the rating was eventually upgraded to 3 and a 1/2 out of 5. Uncut wrote, "Gwen Stefani should be nervous", while Sal Cinquemani of Slant Magazine criticized Perry's vocal performances, and compared the title track to "No Doubt's 'Just a Girl' sans personality and conviction". Alex Miller of NME discouraged music consumers with "even a passing interest in actually enjoying a record" from buying it.

Robert Christgau gave the album a two-star honorable mention in his Consumer Guide review, citing "I Kissed a Girl" and "One of the Boys" as highlights while writing, "She stopped taping her 'suckers' down, and kissing her girlfriend was just an experiment, but trumpeting her vulnerability she's as loud and laddish as a hockey fan".

Year-end lists

Commercial performance
One of the Boys debuted at number nine on the US Billboard 200, with 47,000 copies sold in the first-week released. The album has sold 1,730,000 copies in the United States as of August 2020 and has been certified triple platinum by the Recording Industry Association of America (RIAA). The album has been on the chart for ninety- two weeks. In Canada, the album debuted at number ten, and peaked at number six, It has since been certified double platinum by Music Canada.

In the United Kingdom, the album peaked at number eleven on the UK Albums Chart, and has sold 718,000 copies as of April 2020. It has since been certified 2× Platinum by the British Phonographic Industry. In Australia, it debuted at number eleven, and has been certified platinum by the Australian Recording Industry Association (ARIA), denoting over 70,000 copies sold. In New Zealand, the album debuted and peaked at number seventeen. It has since been certified Gold, shipping over 7,500 copies. One of the Boys has sold 7 million copies worldwide as of August 2010.

Accolades

Track listing

Notes
  signifies a co-producer
  signifies a remixer

Personnel

 Chris Anokute – A&R
 Nick Banns – engineer
 Benny Blanco – drums, producer, programming
 Doug Boehm – engineer
 Jeff Bova – programming
 Paul Bushnell – bass
 Michael Caffery – drum engineering, drum producer, engineer
 Daniel Chase – keyboards, programming
 Angelica Cob-Baehler – A&R
 Scott Cutler – guitar, producer
 Cathy Dennis – background vocals
 Darren Dodd – drums
 Ned Douglas – engineer, programming
 Michael Elins – photography
 Mike Fennel – drum engineering
 Brian "Big Bass" Gardner – mastering
 Aniela Gottwald – engineer
 Lukasz "Dr. Luke" Gottwald – producer
 Sean Gould – engineer, guitar
 Gary Grant – horn section
 Paul David Hager – engineer
 John Hanes – mixing
 Jerry Hey – horn arrangements, horn section
 Dan Higgins – horn section
 Sam Hollander – programming
 Shayne Ivy – design, illustrations
 Dave Katz – guitar, programming
 Stephanie Kubiak – coordination
 Bill Malina – engineer
 Max Martin – guitar, producer
 Katy Perry – piano, producer, vocals, human whistle
 Anne Preven – producer
 Bill Reichenbach, Jr. – horn section
 Tim Roberts – assistant
 S*A*M – producer
 Ed Sherman – art direction
 Gary "G" Silver – production coordination
 Sluggo – producer
 Dave Stewart – guitar, musician, producer
 Butch Walker – musician, producer
 Greg Wells – bass, beats,  engineer, guitar, musician, piano, producer
 Steven Wolf – drums
 Emily Wright – engineer
 Joe Zook – mixing

Charts

Weekly charts

Year-end charts

Certifications and sales

References

Footnotes

Sources

External links
 
 One of the Boys Videos

2008 albums
Albums produced by Benny Blanco
Albums produced by Butch Walker
Albums produced by Dr. Luke
Albums produced by Glen Ballard
Albums produced by Greg Wells
Albums produced by S*A*M and Sluggo
Capitol Records albums
Katy Perry albums
Albums produced by David A. Stewart
Pop rock albums by American artists
Soft rock albums by American artists